Dmitri Vladimirovich Vavilov (born 2 February 1986) is a Russian professional football player who plays for Yuni Minsk.

Club career
He played in the Russian Football National League for FC Lada Togliatti in 2006.

External links
 Career summary by sportbox.ru (in Russian)
 
 

1986 births
Living people
Russian footballers
Association football defenders
FC Lada-Tolyatti players
FC Dynamo Kirov players
FC Mashuk-KMV Pyatigorsk players
FC Kyzylzhar players
FC Uzda players
Kazakhstan Premier League players
Russian expatriate footballers
Expatriate footballers in Kazakhstan
Expatriate footballers in Belarus